Allister Haddon Sparks (10 March 1933 – 19 September 2016) was a South African writer, journalist, and political commentator. He was the editor of The Rand Daily Mail when it broke Muldergate, the story of how the apartheid government secretly funded information projects.

Early life
He was born in Cathcart, Eastern Cape, to father Harold Sparks, a farmer and mother Bernice Stephen. The Sparks family were descendants of the English 1820 Settlers that settled that area of the Cape. He was educated at Queen's College in Queenstown.

Career
Allister Sparks began his journalism career at the Queenstown Daily Representative in 1951. In 1955, he reported for the Bulawayo Chronicle in Rhodesia. He worked as an editor under Donald Woods, who was editor-in-chief at the East London Daily Dispatch from 1956-1957. Afterwards, he worked for the Reuters news agency in Britain. He was a journalist for The Rand Daily Mail and then a columnist in the 1960s. Sparks was later the editor of the Sunday Express. The highlight of his career was his editor position at the Rand Daily Mail. He worked for the Mail since 1967 as an editor and was let go when the board decided to target a white audience. He followed his position as an editor by working as a correspondent with top-level newspapers, including The Washington Post''', The Observer (UK), and NRC Handelsblad in the Netherlands.

In 1994, he wrote an extensive piece in The New Yorker, about Nelson Mandela.

In 1995, he researched and narrated the documentary series Death of Apartheid. He died in Johannesburg on 19 September 2016 due to a heart attack following an infection.

Publishing highlights
Sparks later wrote a number of critically acclaimed books on South Africa's transition from apartheid, including The Mind of South Africa (1991), Tomorrow Is Another Country (1996), and more recently Beyond the Miracle: Inside the New South Africa (University of Chicago Press 2006). Sparks also wrote the book First Drafts (2008), as well as Tutu: The Authorised Portrait of Desmond Tutu, with a Foreword by His Holiness The Dalai Lama written with Tutu's daughter, and published in 2011 for Tutu's 80th birthday. He published his memoires, The Sword and the Pen: Six decades on the political frontier (2016), shortly before his death.

Developing African journalism
Sparks founded the Institute for the Advancement of Journalism in South Africa and was its executive director from 1992 to 1997. The IAJ has focused on the education of African journalists and fostering better communication between professionals across the continent.

Awards and honors
Sparks was a Nieman Fellow from 1962-1963.

He won the Louis M. Lyons Award while with The ObserverIn 1996: The Media Institute of Southern Africa presented Allister Sparks with its Press Freedom Award. According to MISA, 
 
He was the first South African journalist to receive the award.

 Works 
 The Mind of South Africa, 1990; Random House, 2011, 
 Tomorrow Is Another Country, 1995
 Beyond the Miracle: Inside the New South Africa University of Chicago Press, 2003, 
 First Drafts, 2009,  
 Tutu: The Authorised Portrait of Desmond Tutu, with a Foreword by His Holiness The Dalai Lama, with photographs supplied by Tutu's daughter, 2011
 The Sword and the Pen: Six decades on the political frontier'', 2016,

References

External links 
 Recounting a revolution
 Legendary South African Journalist Allister Sparks on Wiretapping and Torture, Under Apartheid and Bush, Transcript of Thursday, 23 February 2006 interview by Democracy Now!'s Amy Goodman,  mp3 interview here

1933 births
2016 deaths
South African journalists
South African newspaper editors
White South African people
South African people of English descent
Nieman Fellows
People from the Eastern Cape